Buenache de Alarcón is a municipality in the province of  Cuenca, Castile-La Mancha, Spain. It has a population of 616.

References 

Municipalities in the Province of Cuenca